Luke McShane (born 6 November 1985) is a footballer playing for St Neots Town.

Footballing career

Peterborough United
McShane started his career at Peterborough United and also had loan spells at Deeping Rangers, Stamford, Hornchurch, twice at Kettering Town, twice at Gravesend & Northfleet, Basingstoke Town and Worksop Town. He plays as a goalkeeper. On 12 March 2007 McShane was released by Peterborough United, after making one FA Cup appearance, a 2–0 win against MK Dons, earning praise from Posh manager Barry Fry after keeping a clean sheet, McShane was called into action just 10 minutes before kickoff due to a back injury that first choice 'keeper Mark Tyler had suffered in pre-match training. He was linked a group of non-league clubs after his release from Peterborough.

Cambridge United
After his release by Peterborough, McShane signed on non contract terms with Cambridge Regional College, before joining Cambridge United on 17 July 2007. On 1 March 2008 Cambridge United announced that McShane had left the club by mutual consent.

Spalding United
After being released by Cambridge McShane was snapped up by Unibond First Division South outfit Spalding United. He was a star performer in what was a dismal season for the Tulips.

Luke McShane is a fast and youthful goalkeeper who is one of the best goalkeepers in non league says St Neots manager Steve Lomas .

References

External links
Profile at UpThePosh! The Peterborough United Database

1985 births
Living people
Sportspeople from Peterborough
English footballers
Association football goalkeepers
Peterborough United F.C. players
Deeping Rangers F.C. players
Stamford A.F.C. players
Hornchurch F.C. players
Kettering Town F.C. players
Ebbsfleet United F.C. players
Basingstoke Town F.C. players
Worksop Town F.C. players
Cambridge Regional College F.C. players
Cambridge United F.C. players
Spalding United F.C. players
St Neots Town F.C. players